Madly in Life is a 2020 Belgian comedy-drama film written and directed by Ann Sirot and Raphaël Balboni in their feature directorial debut. The film stars Jo Deseure, Jean Le Peltier, Lucie Debay and Gilles Remiche, and follows an aging woman dealing with her progressing dementia with the help of her son. It was the last film in which Remiche starred before his death in 2022.

The film had its world premiere as the opening film at the Namur Film Festival on 2 October 2020. It was theatrically released in Belgium on 4 November 2020, before streaming in other territories starting on 14 January 2022. Upon release, Madly in Life was acclaimed by critics, who lauded the cast performances and the production values as well as the sensitive portrayal of its subject matter.

At the 11th Magritte Awards, Madly in Life received a record-tying twelve nominations and won seven awards, including Best Film and Best Screenplay for Sirot and Balboni.

Cast
Jo Deseure as Suzanne Merteens
Jean Le Peltier as Alex
Lucie Debay as Noémie
Gilles Remiche as Kevin

Accolades

References

External links
 

2020 films
2020 comedy-drama films
2020 directorial debut films
2020s French-language films
Belgian comedy-drama films
Films about dementia
Magritte Award winners
Films about mother–son relationships